David Cairns (born 9 February 1951) is a retired Scottish footballer who made over 140 appearances in the Scottish League for Cowdenbeath as a left back. He also played for Brechin City, Berwick Rangers, Forfar Athletic, Raith Rovers and East Fife.

Career statistics

Honours
Cowdenbeath

Fife Cup: 1970–71

Individual

Cowdenbeath Hall of Fame

References

1951 births
Scottish footballers
Living people
Association football fullbacks
Sportspeople from St Andrews
Cowdenbeath F.C. players
Rangers F.C. players
Berwick Rangers F.C. players
Scottish Football League players
Brechin City F.C. players
St Johnstone F.C. players
Raith Rovers F.C. players
Shrewsbury Town F.C. players
East Fife F.C. players
Forfar Athletic F.C. players
Footballers from Fife